Ancient Rome was the city, state, and civilisation of Rome during antiquity.

Ancient Rome may also refer to:
Ancient Rome (painting), a painting by Giovanni Paolo Panini
Ancient Rome: The Rise and Fall of an Empire, a 2006 BBC One docudrama series

See also

Agriculture in ancient Rome
Ancient Roman architecture
History of Rome
History of the Roman Empire
Roman Empire (disambiguation)
Roman imperial period (chronology)
Roman Iron Age
Roman Republic (disambiguation)
Rome (disambiguation)